Qarah Aghaj-e Olya (also Romanized as Qarah Āghāj-e ‘Olyā; also known as Qarah Āghāj and Qareh Āghāj) is a village in Bakeshluchay Rural District, in the Central District of Urmia County, West Azerbaijan Province, Iran. At the 2006 census, its population was 376, in 101 families.

References 

Populated places in Urmia County